Ulotrichopus is a genus of moths in the family Erebidae. The genus was described by Wallengren in 1860.

Species
 Ulotrichopus catocala (Felder and Rogenhofer, 1874)
 Ulotrichopus dinawa Bethune-Baker, 1906
 Ulotrichopus eugeniae Saldaitis & Ivinskis, 2010
 Ulotrichopus fatilega (Felder & Rogenhofer, 1874)
 Ulotrichopus longipalpus Joicey and Talbot, 1915
 Ulotrichopus macula (Hampson, 1891)
 Ulotrichopus marmoratus Griveaud and Viette, 1961
 Ulotrichopus mesoleuca (Walker, 1858)
 Ulotrichopus meyi Kühne, 2005
 Ulotrichopus nigricans Laporte, 1973
 Ulotrichopus ochreipennis (Butler, 1878)
 Ulotrichopus phaeoleucus Hampson, 1913
 Ulotrichopus phaeoleucus griseus Kühne, 2005
 Ulotrichopus phaeopera Hampson, 1913
 Ulotrichopus primulina (Hampson, 1902)
 Ulotrichopus pseudocatocala (Strand, 1918)
 Ulotrichopus pseudomarmoratus Kühne, 2005
 Ulotrichopus rama (Moore, 1885)
 Ulotrichopus recchiai Berio, 1978
 Ulotrichopus stertzi (Püngeler, 1907)
 Ulotrichopus sumatrensis L. B. Prout, 1928
 Ulotrichopus tinctipennis (Hampson, 1902)
 Ulotrichopus trisa (Swinhoe, 1899)
 Ulotrichopus usambarae Kühne, 2005
 Ulotrichopus variegata (Hampson, 1902)
 Ulotrichopus varius Kühne, 2005

Formerly placed here
Ulotrichopus catocaloides Strand
Ulotrichopus glaucescens
Ulotrichopus leucopasta
Ulotrichopus lucidus Pinhey, 1968
Ulotrichopus maccvoodi Hampson, 1913 is now considered to be a synonym of Catocala sponsalis Walker, 1858
Ulotrichopus tessmanni Gaede, 1936
Ulotrichopus tortuosus Wallengren, 1860

References

"Revision und Phylogenie der Gattungsgruppe Crypsotidia Rothschild, 1901, Tachosa Walker, 1869, Hypotacha Hampson, 1913, Audea Walker, 1857 und Ulotrichopus Wallengren, 1860 (Lepidoptera, Noctuidae, Catocalinae)"

 
Catocalini
Noctuoidea genera